Nepenthes ultra is a tropical pitcher plant native to the Philippine island of Luzon, where it grows at low altitude on ultramafic soils (hence the name).

Nepenthes ultra belongs to the informal "N. alata group", which also includes N. alata, N. ceciliae, N. copelandii, N. extincta, N. graciliflora, N. hamiguitanensis, N. kitanglad, N. kurata, N. leyte, N. mindanaoensis, N. negros, N. ramos, and N. saranganiensis. These species are united by a number of morphological characters, including winged petioles, lids with basal ridges on the lower surface (often elaborated into appendages), and upper pitchers that are usually broadest near the base.

References

 Cheek, M. 2014. 12 new carnivorous plant species from the Philippines. Kew Science Blog, 20 January 2014. 
 Mey, F.S. 2013. Nepenthes ultra, yet another new species from the Philippines. Strange Fruits: A Garden's Chronicle, November 6, 2013.
 Smith, L. 2014. Pitcher perfect - but carnivorous plants are at risk. The Independent, January 5, 2014. 

Carnivorous plants of Asia
ultra
Plants described in 2013
Taxa named by Martin Cheek
Taxa named by Matthew Jebb